No. 654 Squadron RAF was a unit of the Royal Air Force during the Second World War. Numbers 651 to 663 Squadrons of the RAF were Air Observation Post units working closely with Army units in artillery spotting and liaison. Their duties and squadron numbers were transferred to the Army with the formation of the Army Air Corps on 1 September 1957.

History

No. 654 Squadron was formed at RAF Old Sarum, Wiltshire, on 15 July 1942 and went into action on August 1943 in North Africa. From December 1943, it served in Italy, where it remained until disbanding at Campoformido on 24 June 1947.

No. 1906 Air Observation Post Flight was formed within 654 Squadron previously elements of 'A' & 'B' Flights along with No. 1907 Air Observation Post Flight which was formed within 654 Squadron previously elements of 'A' & 'C' Flights.

Present
The original squadron was represented by 654 Squadron of 4 Regiment, Army Air Corps. 654 AAC disbanded in July 2014, as part of Army 2020.

Aircraft operated

See also
List of Royal Air Force aircraft squadrons

References

Notes

Bibliography

External links
No.654 Squadron, Army Air Corps
Squadron histories for nos. 651-670 squadron on RAFWeb

Aircraft squadrons of the Royal Air Force in World War II
654 Squadron
Military units and formations established in 1942